Forey Duckett is a former cornerback in the National Football League.

Biography
Duckett was born William Forey Duckett on February 5, 1970 in Oakland, California.

Career
Duckett was drafted by the Cincinnati Bengals in the fifth round of the 1993 NFL Draft. In his first season with them he did not see any playing time during the regular season. He spent the 1994 NFL season with the Bengals, the Green Bay Packers, and the Seattle Seahawks.

He played at the collegiate level at the University of Nevada, Reno.

See also
List of Green Bay Packers players

References

Living people
1970 births
Players of American football from Oakland, California
Cincinnati Bengals players
Green Bay Packers players
Seattle Seahawks players
American football defensive backs
Nevada Wolf Pack football players